World Golf Tour (abbreviated WGT Golf and WGT by Topgolf) is an online multiplayer virtual golf game. It is played virtually on actual golf courses located in the United States, the United Kingdom, the Netherlands, Canada and Mexico, using a patented 3D photorealistic georeferencing technology. Players can play with their family or friends, join a foursome, or start their own game. Players can choose and compete in a variety of virtual golf courses with up to four players at a time, play individually or enter into a skills challenge or in tournaments for prizes.

Co-founders of WGT Media Chad Nelson and YuChiang Cheng collaborated in 2006 to come up with a high-quality golf game simulation that could be played for free on the Internet, and compete with or surpass the visual quality of console video sports games. Part of the intended goal was to have a fully integrated social golfing network website. They recruited JF Prata and Phil Gorrow of Electronic Arts to build the physics game engine that interfaces the thousands of photographs of each golf course that are used to create the WGT Golf experience. WGT Media launched a demo of the site in 2007 and commenced an open beta test in October 2008. The first golf course WGT Media captured and developed for play was the Ocean Course at Kiawah Island Golf Resort, located in South Carolina.

Because of its authenticity in photographing and using actual golf courses for game development, WGT Golf differs from standard console video sports games that are produced fully by computer graphics, rendered by animators. Using this particular process of game development, it can allow real golfers to play virtually on real golf courses at WGT Golf and then take that knowledge and experience out to the actual golf courses themselves to test their skills and ability. Members of the PGA have even practiced at WGT Golf before going to tournaments.

WGT Media does not charge a fee to play the HD courses it has developed (although there is a green fee for licensed non-HD courses). WGT Media derives revenue from high-profile online tournament sponsors, advertisements, and in-game micro transactions for upgrading player golfing equipment and for different choices in costume avatar clothing. Tournament cash prizes can be won and then used to buy virtual goods, like new clubs and clothing to customize the in-game avatar.
In January 2011, a foursome completed the 100 millionth virtual round of golf played on WGT Golf. In October 2013, World Golf Tour Media released the mobile version for tablets and smartphones.

Game development 
WGT Golf is developed using Adobe Creative Suite 4 Web Premium software. WGT Media starts the process of game development by taking thousands of high definition photos of actual golf courses using helicopters equipped with cameras and GPS tracking systems. WGT Media then textures the photographs onto the 3D environment, using Adobe Premiere Pro to determine how each of the different surfaces will have an effect on the ball. The terrain is within 1-1.5 inch vertical accuracy of the real world. Computer animation, using Adobe Flash CS4 Professional, is then used to create the avatars that are used as the golfer for each player.

To replicate how the golf ball reacts to the club swing, rolls across the green, or bounces down the fairway, WGT Media ran various tests to measure impact and collision data. The data were then entered into WGT's newly created game physics engine to determine how each player's golf swing would affect ball travel based on input by the player.

Lastly Adobe Flash is then used to stream audio and video together for a seamless transition from picture to picture during game play, as a player moves down the fairway or makes a putt.

Tiers and levels 
WGT Golf players are assigned to "tiers" reflecting their skill. From lowest to highest, the tiers are Hack, Amateur, Pro, Tour Pro, Expert, Tour Expert, Master, Tour Master, Legend, Tour Legend, Champion and Tour Champion.

Players advance from one tier to the next based on their current scoring average and number of rounds played at their current tier. Players are challenged at each successive tier by facing standard playing conditions featuring longer tees and/or faster greens. Players can only rise; players cannot retreat from that tier to a lower one even if the average score rises. Certain tournaments on the site are open only to players in certain tiers, and in some competitions between players of different tiers the players play from different sets of tees depending on each player's tier.

According to player research on the site, as of October 2011 there were over 1,900 WGT Golf players who had advanced to the Legend tier.

Apart from tiers, players are also assigned to "levels" which chiefly reflect the amount of play rather than the player's skill. Players "level up" by earning "experience points," which are based on playing games in certain formats, playing on consecutive days, winning awards and so on. The number of experience points required to rise to the next level increases dramatically as higher levels are reached. Levels are important to players because certain virtual golf equipment may be purchased by players only when they reach a certain level, with the equipment available to higher-level players generally being of higher quality (e.g. clubs that hit the ball farther and more accurately).

Golf courses developed for play at WGT Golf

Stroke play (full 18 holes)

United States 
Bandon Dunes Golf Resort, Coos County (near Bandon), Oregon
Bethpage Black Course; Old Bethpage, Melville and East Farmingdale; New York
Chambers Bay, University Place, Washington
Congressional Country Club (Blue Course), Potomac, Maryland
Erin Hills, Erin, Wisconsin
Kiawah Island Golf Resort (Ocean Course), Kiawah Island, South Carolina
Merion Golf Club (East Course), Haverford and Ardmore, Pennsylvania
Oakmont Country Club, Plum, Pennsylvania
The Olympic Club (Lake Course), San Francisco and San Mateo County, California
Pebble Beach Golf Links, Pebble Beach and Carmel-by-the-Sea, California
Pinehurst Resort (No. 2 Course), Pinehurst, North Carolina
 Wolf Creek Golf Club, Mesquite, Nevada
Torrey Pines, La Jolla, California

United Kingdom 
Old Course at St Andrews, St Andrews, Scotland
Royal St George's Golf Club, Sandwich, England

Canada 
Fairmont Chateau Whistler Golf Club, Whistler, British Columbia

Mexico 
The Ocean Course at Cabo del Sol, Los Cabos Municipality (near Cabo San Lucas), Baja California Sur

Closest-to-the-hole challenges (9 holes, or in some cases two different sets of 9 holes each)

United States 
Bali Hai Golf Club, Paradise and Enterprise, Nevada
Edgewood Tahoe Golf Course, Stateline, Nevada/South Lake Tahoe, California
Harbour Town Golf Links, Hilton Head Island, South Carolina
Koele Golf Course, Lanai City, Hawaii
Manele Golf Course, Manele, Hawaii
Pinehurst Resort (No. 8 Course), Pinehurst, North Carolina
Valhalla Golf Club, Louisville, Kentucky

United Kingdom 
Celtic Manor Resort (Twenty Ten Course), Newport, Wales

Netherlands 
Hilversumsche Golf Club, Hilversum, North Holland/De Bilt, Utrecht

Closest-to-the-hole challenges can also be played on each of the courses that are available for full stroke play.

Future courses 
In line with its USGA tie-in, WGT Media has published a preview of the new courses that will be launched on the site in conjunction with the upcoming locations for the U.S. Open: Winged Foot (2020).

In WGT's tie-in with The R&A for The Open Championship, it may release further courses in the rota in future years, but so far no long-range commitment between WGT Media and The R&A has been announced.

Criticism and cheating 
There has always been criticism from some of WGT's playerbase, a portion of which is aimed at WGT Media's business model and the 'jumpy meter'. The meter, a moving bar used to give the desired direction to the shot, is often disturbingly 'jumpy' (as non-fluid) and results in a considerable disruption of the gaming experience. Some players speculate that it is left unpatched by WGT to further encourage microtransactions for better equipment; which, while alleviating some of the game's difficulty, can cost upwards of US$20.00 for a single club.

Another concern has been 'sandbagging', a term coined by the community to discuss an ongoing issue of skilled players artificially lowering their average score. This practice is used to compete in tournament brackets far below the skill level of the "sandbagger", thus giving them a better chance to place high and win in-game credits at the expense of the other players.

Finally, quitting the game before completion has been a concern since the early years of WGT. It typically occurs when a player is performing poorly and decides to abandon the game, so as to preserve their average score. Players have repeatedly called for WGT to reduce a person's score when they habitually quit as a deterrent to this behavior. In an attempt to remedy these concerns a 'reputation indicator' was introduced, showing players the percentage of finished games of others before the round is started. The advent of challenge games, which require an amount of non-redeemable credits to be put upfront, and which are lost if the player leaves, has also discouraged quitting. Nonetheless, some in the community still call for some sort of punishment to a quitter's score, despite the fact that quitting forfeits a match for the offender and has no negative impact on the score of other players.

Partners and the World Wide Web 
WGT Media enters into license agreements with real golf courses and tournament owners such as the United States Golf Association (USGA) and The R&A.  WGT has also made agreements with equipment providers and other companies including TruGolf, Taylor Made, Adams Golf, Ping, Lynx, Nike, Snake Eyes Golf, Cleveland, Callaway, Titleist, Srixon, Loudmouth Golf, American Express, Sky Golf, Adidas Golf, Ketel One vodka, Lexus, Old Granddad bourbon, and Pilsner Urquell.

The United States Golf Association (USGA) partnered with WGT Media in 2009 to co-host the first annual Virtual USGA Championship online. The Virtual U.S. Open attracted hundreds of thousands of players from more than 180 countries, and by its third year, over 2 million qualifying rounds were played. The event was won by Wayne Stopak (aka NASAgolfer), with a final round 66 on Bethpage Black. Stopak received a replica of the US Open trophy and a trip for two to Pebble Beach for the 2010 US Open. A similar competition was held in 2010, using the Oakmont course that hosted the Women's Open. One of WGT Golf's dominant players, BolloxInBruges, won a trip to the 2011 US Open, at Congressional. He shot rounds of 61–63. The 2011 Virtual U.S. Open at Congressional, May–June 2011, was won by mrenn29 with final-round scores of 64 and 57. The 2012 Virtual U.S. Open at The Olympic Club was won by StoneColdKiller, winner of the 2011 Virtual Open Championship at Royal St. George's, with record-low rounds of 57–55.

In 2010, the first Virtual Open (British) Championship 2010 was held at St. Andrews. It was won by AvatarLee, with rounds of 58 and 63, for a golfing trip to Scotland. The 2011 Virtual Open Championship at Royal St. George's, in June–July 2011, was won by StoneColdKiller, with rounds of 58 and 61.

WGT Golf can also be launched and played from a number of online organizations including USGA.org, ESPN.com and Facebook. Social networking apps can also be added to anyone's Facebook home page to let family and friends know where you play virtual golf, read blog entries about your latest game, and track your golfing statistics. WGT Golf allows a player to post their own replays of their best 10 shots they've taken in the past. External voice chat communications programs, for example Ventrillo, Team Speak, Skype and Roger Wilco, can be used to communicate with other players, while playing golf at WGT Golf, making it easier to communicate with other players.

References

External links
 

Golf video games
Multiplayer online games
Browser games
Free online games
2008 video games
Video games developed in the United States